The Chilean Open is a defunct Grand Prix affiliated men's tennis tournament played from 1976 to 1981. This outdoor clay court tournament was played in Santiago, Chile.

Finals

Singles

Doubles

See also
 Chile Open – men's tournament (1993–2014)

References
 ATP Results Archive

Clay court tennis tournaments
Tennis tournaments in Chile
Grand Prix tennis circuit
1976 establishments in Chile
1981 disestablishments in Chile
Defunct tennis tournaments in South America
Defunct sports competitions in Chile
Recurring sporting events established in 1976
Recurring sporting events disestablished in 1981
Sport in Santiago